Maha Singh Rao (born 1 July 1958) is a wrestler and wrestling coach from Chirawa, Rajasthan in India. In 2006, he was awarded the Dronacharya Award, the highest award of the land in the field of coaching of sports and athletics, He born in Rao family of Ghadana Khurd Village in District Jhunjhunu of Rajsthan.  by the government of India.

Early life
He was the fourth son out of a family of 6 children born to Bhana Ram Rao and Mohri devi in a small village Ghardana Khurd in Jhunjhunu Rajasthan. After attaining his primary education in the same village he proceeded on to high school in Khetri and then graduated in Mathematics from Chirawa college, Chirawa in Jhunjhunu in 1980. His marriage was solemnised to Mrs Santosh on 15 June 1983.

Career
After finishing his studies he joined the Sports Authority of India as a Wrestling Coach. He started training disciples in both freestyle wrestling and Indian style also known as pehlwani. His initial posting was in Guru Hanuman Akhara in New Delhi which was at that time being managed by Guru Hanuman, a legendary figure in the Indian style of wrestling. Maha Singh started training the budding pehlwans under the able guidance of Guru Hanuman. He was briefly transferred to Sri Ganganagar, Rajasthan but soon was sent back to Delhi where he is currently training wrestlers in the Guru Hanuman Akhara in New Delhi. After the demise of Guru Hanuman in May 1999 the whole responsibility of managing and training the young wrestlers came down on Maha singh.

Recognising his potential he was sent by the Government of India to attend the international coaching course in Budapest, Hungary in 2005. The course is conducted by the Universitas Budapestinesis de semmelweis nominata and is recognised by the international Olympic council for Olympic solidarity. Later he was selected for the prestigious Dronacharya Award for the year 2005. 
Many of his disciples have won national and international titles including the prestigious Arjun Award. Notables include Sandeep kumar Rathi (Bharat Kesri), Rajiv Tomar (Hind Kesri and Arjun Award Winner), Anuj Chaudhary (Arjun Award Winner), Sujeet maan (Arjun Award Winner). Rajiv Tomar won the gold medal in the commonwealth games in 2006.

References

1958 births
Indian male sport wrestlers
Sportspeople from Rajasthan
Recipients of the Dronacharya Award
University of Rajasthan alumni
Rajasthani people
Living people
Indian wrestling coaches
People from Jhunjhunu district